Is-sur-Tille is a commune in the Côte-d'Or department of Bourgogne-Franche-Comté France.

Geography
Is-sur-Tille is located about twenty kilometers north of Dijon, on the river Ignon, close to its confluence with the Tille. To the west is a heavily forested limestone plateau with an elevation of over 400 meters. To the east is a humid clay plain sloping gently to the southeast of the Saône.

Population

See also
Communes of the Côte-d'Or department

References

Communes of Côte-d'Or